The 1972 Skipper Chrysler 6 Hour Le Mans was an endurance motor race for Sports Open, Sports Closed, Improved Production Touring Cars & Series Production Touring Cars. The event was staged by the W.A. Sporting Car Club at the Wanneroo Park Circuit in Western Australia on Sunday 4 June 1972. It was the 18th and final 6 Hour Le Mans race to be held.

Results

Race statistics
 Start: Le Mans-style
 Starters: 37
 Average speed of winning car: 73.79 mph
 Race record: Thackwell & Mullins set a new race record of 295 laps, breaking that set by Howie Sangster & Don O'Sullivan in the 1970 race by eight laps.

References & notes 

 The Racing Car News race report states that there were 37 starters in the event with 21 finishers and 16 DNFs. The race results published at www.terrywalkersplace.com list 35 starters, 23 finishers and 12 DNFs.
 The results at www.terrywalkersplace.com show the Kennedy / Lyons Mini as winning its class although its outright position is lower than that of the Valikov / Tyler Honda which is shown as 2nd in that class. The above results table reflects those published at www.terrywalkersplace.com.
 Racing Car News lists Kostera / Cole, Russell / Hagarty and Coleman / Barrett as 6th, 7th and 8th respectively which differs from the results at www.terrywalkersplace.com

Six Hours Le Mans
Six Hours Le Mans
June 1972 sports events in Australia